Travis Oates is an American voice actor. He continued the role of Piglet in My Friends Tigger & Pooh and other Winnie the Pooh-related media after the passing of John Fiedler in 2005. He and Jim Cummings were the only two voice actors to return for the 2011 film. He also was one of the original co-hosts of the G4TV original program Arena, a competitive gaming show with Wil Wheaton in 2002. Oates owns and manages the ACME Comedy Theatre in Costa Mesa, California. He directed the 2014 film Don't Blink.

Filmography

Television
Arena - Co-host (2002)
Doc McStuffins - Piglet (2017)
My Friends Tigger & Pooh - Piglet
Piper's QUICK Picks - Himself - Guest
The Emperor's New School - Rudy, Additional voices
Mini Adventures of Winnie the Pooh - Piglet

Movies
Deadly Lessons - Bulwart
Engaging Peter - Jack
Fish in a Barrel - Hippie Cashier
Poet Heads - Club Manager
Pooh's Heffalump Halloween Movie - Additional voices
Kronk's New Groove - Additional voices
Winnie the Pooh - Piglet

Video games
Kinect Disneyland Adventures - Piglet
Kingdom Hearts II - Piglet
Kingdom Hearts II: Final Mix+ - Piglet
Kingdom Hearts III - Piglet
The Lego Movie Videogame - Additional voices
Turning Point: Fall of Liberty - Farrel
White Knight Chronicles - Amir, additional voices

References

External links 
 

Living people
American male video game actors
American male voice actors
Place of birth missing (living people)
Year of birth missing (living people)